Così, based in Boston, Massachusetts, is an American fast-casual restaurant chain that is known for its homemade flatbread. The name comes from the opera Così fan tutte, which was a favorite of the original owner.  As of November 2020, the company operated 20 locations in New York, Washington D.C., Virginia, Pennsylvania, Massachusetts, Connecticut, Illinois, Indiana, and Ohio, down from 66 at the beginning of the year. The chain filed for Chapter 11 bankruptcy in February 2020.

History

The original Così restaurant was opened in 1989 by Drew Harre in Paris, France. In 1996, Shep and Jay Wainwright opened the first Così in the United States, in New York.

In October 1999, Così merged with Xando (formerly ZuZu).

The company became a public company via an initial public offering in 2002. A year later, Kevin Armstrong was named chief executive officer of the company.

In June 2010, Così sold its District of Columbia stores to Capitol C Restaurants as franchises. Capitol C is the owner of Qdoba Mexican Grill.

In March 2014, Così's largest and most successful franchisee, RJ Dourney was voted by Così's board of directors to the position of CEO and Director and Così announced it was moving its corporate headquarters from Deerfield, Illinois to Boston, Massachusetts. However, in August 2016, CEO RJ Dourney was fired. That same year, the company filed for Chapter 11 Bankruptcy reorganization and closed stores. As a result of the bankruptcy filing, the company's shares were de-listed from the NASDAQ. Cosi also sought buyers for "substantially all of its assets."

In May 2017, the company emerged from bankruptcy under the ownership of MILFAM II L.P., AB Value Partners, LP, AB Value Management LLC and AB Opportunity Fund LLC. However, on February 25, 2020, Così once again filed for Chapter 11 bankruptcy after closing several locations. However, the company then withdrew its filing and instead seek pandemic aid from the government. Then, after surviving the pandemic, on July 1, 2022, Cosi reopened its bankruptcy.

References

Further reading

External links

 

1996 establishments in New York City
Restaurant chains in the United States
Bakery cafés
Bakeries of the United States
Fast-food franchises
Fast casual restaurants
Companies formerly listed on the Nasdaq
Restaurants established in 1996
Companies that filed for Chapter 11 bankruptcy in 2016
Companies that filed for Chapter 11 bankruptcy in 2020
Companies that filed for Chapter 11 bankruptcy in 2022
American companies established in 1996
Food and drink companies based in Boston